The Dove Foundation is an American non-profit organization based in Portland, Oregon, that issues film reviews, ratings and endorsements of movies that it considers suitable for family audiences, and that bases said reviews on Christian values.

Description
The organization was founded in 1991 as a not-for-profit organization. According to the organization's website, its stated mission is "to encourage and promote the creation, production, distribution and consumption of wholesome family entertainment". Although its programs are diversified, it is perhaps best known for reviewing movies for suitability for family viewing, and endorsing acceptable ones with the Dove "Family-Approved" Seal. The organization has also commissioned independent studies completed by the Seidman College of Business at Grand Valley State University to analyze the comparative profitability and return on investment of MPAA-rated films in 1999 and 2005. Those studies have reinforced its efforts to advocate for the production of more values based films and have been relied upon by some in the industry seeking support for their projects. Additionally, Dove has sponsored its Family Film Festival in partnership with local theaters featuring films with its Family-Approved Seal and pioneered a pilot project, "The Dove Movie Channel," to bring free movies to hospitalized children.

The website states that Dove's fund-raising strategy of not soliciting contributions from the film industry for its operations eliminates commercial pressure as a factor in its reviews. However, The Dove Foundation has partnered with commercial enterprises. In one instance, its former association with Feature Films for Families, an on-line retailer of home entertainment, led to questions regarding the nature of the partnership.

Movie rating system
Dove uses an eight-factor content system (using a scale of 0 to 5), from which it derives a movie's overall rating.

The first two factors ("Faith" and "Integrity") are considered "positive" ratings, where a higher number denotes a movie with positive character traits (for "Faith" a rating of 4 or 5 is reserved for movies with overt Christian themes) while a lower number denotes a movie with negative traits.  The remaining six factors ("Sexuality", "Language", "Violence", "Drugs", "Nudity", and "Other", the last category for such objectionable content as "Disrespect for authority, lying, cheating, stealing, illegal activity, frightening scenes, demonic or similar references") are "negative" ratings, where a lower number denotes a movie with few or no objectionable items and a higher number denotes a movie with significant objectionable items.

From the eight factors a movie, if recommended by Dove, can be rated as "All Ages" (no negative factors over 1), "12+" (no negative factors over 2), or "18+" (some negative factors over 2 but with a Faith rating of 4 or 5).

"Opinion poll" campaign
From 2005 to 2007, the organization partnered with Feature Films for Families to conduct a telephone opinion poll regarding movie content. Dove says that over 4.5 million participated in the survey. 300 complaints were lodged with the Missouri Attorney General's No Call unit as a result. Dove and their partner were accused by the state of Missouri of violating its "Do Not Call Implementation Act" by using the opinion poll as a means of circumventing the Act to allow Feature Films For Families to market its products. The state of Missouri imposed a restraining order on these activities in Missouri in March 2006.

As a result of the Missouri Attorney General's lawsuit, Feature Films for Families Inc. of Murray, Utah, and the Dove Foundation reached a settlement agreement in the amount of US$70,000 in August 2006 for the alleged violation of state "No Call" laws.

Dove Channel 
In September 2015, Cinedigm partnered with The Dove Foundation to launch Dove Channel, an online streaming service geared towards kids and faith-based viewers.

References

External links
 Dove Foundation website
 Feature Films for Families website

Advertising and marketing controversies
Entertainment rating organizations
Non-profit organizations based in Michigan
Telemarketing
Organizations established in 1991
1991 establishments in Michigan